RAS-1 (Richard Arthur Smith) is a musician (guitarist/singer) who was in the band Long Beach Shortbus with former Sublime bassist Eric Wilson and Willard "trey" Pangborn of Falling Idols, along with drummer Damien Ramirez. RAS-1 was also a member of Long Beach Dub Allstars along with Eric Wilson and former Sublime drummer Bud Gaugh.

Early life
Richard Arthur Smith is the son of singer Dora Gail Smith formerly of the all girl Long Beach jazz quartet Dream.

Early bands
As a teenager, RAS-1 was in a psychedelic rock band called The Griffin with his cousin J-sun, the current singer/poet of the band Stonewing. 

Following this, he played guitar and sang with a reggae band called Jah Children, which played backyard parties in Long Beach and opened for Sublime on occasion.

See also
List of reggae artists
Long Beach Dub All-Stars
Long Beach Shortbus

References

Year of birth missing (living people)
Living people
Place of birth missing (living people)
Guitarists from California
Long Beach Dub Allstars members
Long Beach Shortbus members